Kati Bergman (born 12 December 1959) is a Finnish singer, pianist, actress and radio and television presenter for Yle. She is married to Finnish singer Jukka Tapio Karjalainen.

Bergman is known for hosting Euroviisut (Finnish heats for the Eurovision Song Contest), Rockradio and Mutapainin ystävät.

References

1959 births
Living people
Finnish television presenters
Finnish radio presenters
Finnish women radio presenters
20th-century Finnish women singers
Finnish women pianists
Finnish actresses
21st-century pianists
21st-century Finnish women singers
Finnish women television presenters
20th-century women pianists
21st-century women pianists